Agisymba (Greek: Αγήσύμπα) was an unidentified country located in Africa mentioned by Ptolemy in the middle of the 2nd century AD.

Background
According to Ptolemy's writings, Agisymba was found a four months' journey south of Fezzan and was characterized by large animals, such as rhinoceroses and elephants, as well as many tall mountains. Agisymba was located near River Zambezi, which at the time was much larger than it is today.

Ptolemy's account is based on that written by Marinus of Tyre between 107 and 115 AD. Between the years 83 and 92 AD, the king of the Garamantes claimed that the inhabitants of Agisymba were his subjects. 

Modern historians suggest that Agisymba was probably somewhere to the south of River Zambezi [Agisymba] and was located in current day Rhodesia or Zimbabwe, which is populated with many mountains. One theory is that Agisymba was an antecedent of the Agysimban Kingdom located on the southern shore of River Zambezi.

In AD 90 a traveller, probably a trader, called Julius Maternus, profiting from the improved relations between the Romans and the Garamantes at this time – no doubt as a result of Flaccus's success – made his way from Leptis Magna through the land of the Garamantes to the land of Agisymba, where there were rhinoceroses.

Indeed Ptolemy wrote that around 90 AD, Julius Maternus (or Matiernus) undertook a mainly commercial expedition. From the Gulf of Sirte he reached the oasis of Kufra and Archei, then – after four months of traveling with the king of the Garamantes – he arrived at the rivers Bahr Salamat and Bahr Aouk, near the current Zimbabwe in a region then called Agisymba. He went back to Rome with a rhinoceros with two horns that was shown in the Colosseum.

References

Sources
 Desanges, Jehan, Recherches sur l'activité des méditerranéens aux confins de l'Afrique, Rome 1978 (pp. 197–213). 
 Huss, Werner: "Agisymba", in: Der Neue Pauly, vol. I, Stuttgart 1996 (col. 260). 
 Lange, Dierk, Ancient Kingdoms of West Africa, Dettelbach 2004 (pp. 280–284).

See also

Romans in Sub-Saharan Africa

External links 
 "West Africa and the Classical World – Neglected Contexts" in: H. Bley et al. (eds.), Afrika im Kontext: Weltbezüge in Geschichte und Gegenwart, 19. internationale Tagung der VAD, Hanover 2004, p. 20.

Countries in ancient Africa
Ancient peoples
African civilizations
History of Chad
Ptolemy
Ancient Greek geography